Jean Valz (1746 in Gard – 1794 in Nîmes) was a French politician. 

He was a member of the bourgeois class, and served as an administrator in the city of Nîmes, Gard. 

He was guillotined in 1794.

1746 births
1794 deaths
French Protestants
French people executed by guillotine during the French Revolution
People from Nîmes